Tessin (Tessin bei Rostock) is a town in the Rostock district, in Mecklenburg-Western Pomerania, Germany. It is situated on the river Recknitz, 22 km east of Rostock.

Notable people
 Ernst Heydemann (1876-1930), German politician and from 1919 to 1930 mayor and Lord Mayor of the Hansestadt Rostock.
 Carl Heydemann (1878-1939), the last Lord Mayor in the Hansestadt Stralsund before the takeover of the National Socialists.
 Roland Methling (born 1954), engineer, Lord Mayor of the Hansestadt Rostock since 2005

References

Cities and towns in Mecklenburg
Populated places established in the 13th century
1340s establishments in the Holy Roman Empire
1343 establishments in Europe
Grand Duchy of Mecklenburg-Schwerin